Samuel Marx (born Simon Marx; October 23, 1859 – May 10, 1933) was the father of American entertainment group (the) Marx Brothers, stars of vaudeville, Broadway and film, and the husband of Minnie Marx, who served as the group's manager.

Life and family
According to his birth certificate, Marx was born as Simon Marx in Alsace, in France. Due to his place of birth, he was known as "Frenchie". His parents were Simon Marx and Johanna Haennchen Isaak; he came to the U.S. from France in 1880. He met Minnie in New York where he was working as a dance teacher. They married in 1884 and had six sons. Their first son, Manfred, born in 1885, died in infancy. The other children were Leonard (Chico), born in 1887, Adolph (Harpo) in 1888, Julius (Groucho) in 1890, Milton (Gummo) in 1892, and Herbert (Zeppo) in 1901. Marx was an excellent pinochle player, a game he taught to his two eldest sons.

Career
Marx became a tailor, although apparently not a very good one. According to Groucho, he was a talented cook, often convincing the landlord to delay their rent pay time with a good meal. In his show An Evening With Groucho, Groucho reminisced about his father, Sam:

Harpo put the bad tailoring down to the fact that Frenchie never took the time to measure a client for a suit, preferring to guess their size. He would then take the suits that clients had rejected, travel to New Jersey, and sell them door-to-door. 

In his last interview, Zeppo joked that his late father "was a very bad tailor but he found some people who were so stupid that they would buy his clothes, and so he'd make a few dollars that way for food".

Cameo appearance with his sons
Marx made a cameo appearance in his four sons' film Monkey Business (1931), sitting on top of luggage behind the brothers on the pier as they wave to the First Officer, having slipped off the ship without being arrested as stowaways. (In some interviews, this scene has been mistakenly attributed  to A Night at the Opera.)

Death
Marx died in Hollywood, California, on May 10, 1933, from complications due to kidney failure. at age of 73. 

He was survived by his brother-in-law Al Shean, sons Chico, Harpo, Groucho, Gummo and Zeppo Marx and grandchildren Maxine, Arthur, Miriam and Robert "Bob" Marx. He was interred at Mount Carmel Cemetery in Glendale, Queens next to his late wife Minnie (who predeceased him in September 1929),

References

External links
Family — The Marx Brothers

1859 births
1933 deaths
People from Bas-Rhin
Alsatian Jews
American male actors
American people of French-Jewish descent
French emigrants to the United States
Deaths from kidney disease